Video gaming is a relatively new sector in Bangladesh. Games have been developed since 2002, mostly independently. However, from 2014, some IT companies have started to develop video games commercially. Some research has been carried out at various universities to improve the video game development sector.

History 
Video gaming was introduced in the country through arcade gaming through a significant growth during the late 1990s because of the availability of personal computers at lower prices. However, local video game development only started in the early 2000s. Dhaka Racing, a racing game set on the streets of Dhaka, is the first 3D game to be developed in the country. The game was designed by two undergraduate students of computer science of North South University and was published independently by eSophers in 2002. Getting a positive response from gamers across the country, the game eventually paved the way for the local video game development sector. A year later, inspired by the success of Dhaka Racing,   Ahmed Shamsul Arefin and Samiran Mahmud, two 4th year students of Chittagong University of Engineering and Technology(CUET), Chittagong developed Chittagong Racing.

In 2004, a first-person shooter (FPS) game titled Arunodoyer Agnishikha, based on the events of the Bangladesh Liberation War, was developed by Trimatrik Interactive. Being the first Bangladeshi game of its genre, it received widespread acclaim and started a new chapter of video game development in the country. In 2012, a group of students from BRAC University developed Aerial Multi-Player Dogfight, which they claimed was the first massively multi-player online (MMO) game for PCs in the world that responds to body movements and voice command.

On 16 December 2012, the first professional game development team after 2004 was formed: Team 71. They started their journey by announcing a first-person shooter game named Liberation 71, based on the Bangladesh Liberation War and inspired by the Arunodoyer Agnishikha. Liberation 71 will contain the actual history and events of the war. The game is a big project using the Unreal 4 game engine, so it is still under development. Team 71 has been called the "pioneer of the computer game development" era of Bangladesh after 2010.

In 2014, Hatirjheel: Dream Begins, an open-world action-adventure game, was developed and published by MassiveStar Studio. It was the first commercially published video game in Bangladesh.

In 2015, The Reels: Welcome to Bangladesh, a story-based linear racing game that allows the player to drive through Dhaka to Chittagong, was being developed by another development team called LAI MASSIVE. The developers were very young and few in numbers, but made a game of next-generation quality. They also made other games like The Division Sa World at War, The Run, and Night Time Bed. In June 2016, Dream World Studio released a third-person shooter game titled Durjoy. A first-person shooter called Hound6: The Escape is being developed by the team as a sequel to Hound6: Strike, which was also released in 2016.

On 25 December 2015, a game called Heroes of 71, based on the Bangladesh Liberation War, was released by Mindfisher Games. Later, on 25 March 2016 a sequel titled Heroes of 71: Retaliation was released. They were downloaded more than 1 million times on the Play Store. On 15 December 2017, a third installment in the series, titled Mukti Camp, was released.

Arunodoyer Agnishikha
Arunodoyer Agnishikha (Bengali: অরুণোদয়ের অগ্নিশিখা) or Flame of Sunrise is a first-person shooter video game developed by Trimatrik Interactive and published by SHOM Computers Ltd. in 2004. Based on the 1971 Bangladesh Liberation War, it is the first first-person shooter video game based on events of the war and developed in Bangladesh.

The plot is based on the events of the Bangladesh Liberation War. These events mainly include the battles that took place in Chittagong, Rajshahi and Akhaura.

The game-play features three options, Battlefield, The Team and Time Limit. Battlefield is the chief game-play where the player has to choose one from four different battlefields of the war.

Research and development 
Lately, there has been some research and development carried out on video games. In 2014, Microsoft Bangladesh organized a game development workshop called Imagine Cup Bangladesh 2014 - Game Camp for the participants of the games category of the Imagine Cup Bangladesh 2014. It was followed by two other game camps. In the same year, MassiveStar Studio began a project to train 80,000 students as video game developers.

The mobile game industry of Bangladesh is also rising rapidly, and some companies provide world-class games. The Mascoteers are a pioneer of Apple Watch games, TV games,  VR Gear games, and many popular arcade games in Bangladesh. They are taking the Bangladeshi video game industry to a new level. Now it's 25 games on the Google Play Store and App Store, along with its games for Apple Watch and TV, and VR Gear powered by Oculus Store. Zenetic Esports is one such company which provides beta-testing and app development to similar game developers. Tap Tap Ants, downloaded 15 million times, is one of the most popular games developed by Rise Up Labs.

Some highly-anticipated games to be released in 2020 are Agontuk and Annihilation. Agontuk will be an open-world game developed by M7 Productions. and Attrito.

References

1990s establishments in Bangladesh
Video gaming in Bangladesh